Jeremy Bagshaw (born 21 April 1992) is a Canadian swimmer and medical student. He competed in the men's 400 metre freestyle event at the 2017 World Aquatics Championships placing 16th.

Training at the University of California-Berkeley, Bagshaw swam for the California Golden Bears Men's swimming team, helping bring them many victories. In 2014 he was named team captain, and the Bears brought home the NCAA's championship. He is currently the fastest 400m freestyler in Canada, holding the time of 3:48.88.

He has represented Canada at the 2015 World Aquatics Championships, 2017 World Aquatics Championships and the 2019 World Aquatics Championships. 

Bagshaw was part of the Canadian team for the 2022 Commonwealth Games. He won a bronze with the men's team in the 4×100 m freestyle, having swam in the heats. This was the first men's relay medal for Canada at a major event since the 2015 Pan American Games, and the first at the Commonwealth Games since 2006.

References

External links
 

1992 births
Living people
Canadian male swimmers
Sportspeople from Singapore
Swimmers at the 2010 Summer Youth Olympics
Swimmers at the 2018 Commonwealth Games
Commonwealth Games medallists in swimming
Commonwealth Games bronze medallists for Canada
Pan American Games medalists in swimming
Pan American Games bronze medalists for Canada
Swimmers at the 2015 Pan American Games
Medalists at the 2015 Pan American Games
Youth Olympic bronze medalists for Canada
Competitors at the 2017 Summer Universiade
Swimmers at the 2022 Commonwealth Games
Medallists at the 2022 Commonwealth Games